Donald James Wuebbles is the Harry E. Preble Endowed Professor in the Department of Atmospheric Sciences at the University of Illinois at Urbana–Champaign. He was formerly the head of this department from 1994 to 2006, and was the founding director of the University of Illinois' School of Earth, Society, and Environment from 2006 to 2008. He is a fellow of the American Association for the Advancement of Science, the American Geophysical Union, and the American Meteorological Society. He has been a Coordinating Lead Author and contributor for the Intergovernmental Panel on Climate Change's reports.

References

External links

Faculty page

American atmospheric scientists
American climatologists
University of Illinois Urbana-Champaign faculty
University of California, Davis alumni
Fellows of the American Association for the Advancement of Science
Fellows of the American Geophysical Union
Year of birth missing (living people)
Living people